Yi Xing (683–727), born Zhang Sui, was a Chinese astronomer, Buddhist monk, inventor, mathematician, mechanical engineer, and philosopher during the Tang dynasty. His astronomical celestial globe featured a liquid-driven escapement, the first in a long tradition of Chinese astronomical clockworks.

Science and technology

Astrogeodetic survey
In the early 8th century, the Tang court put Yi Xing in charge of an astrogeodetic survey. This survey had many purposes. It was established in order to obtain new astronomical data that would aid in the prediction of solar eclipses. The survey was also initiated so that flaws in the calendar system could be corrected and a new, updated calendar installed in its place. The survey was also essential in determining the arc measurement, i.e., the length of meridian arc-although Yi Xing, who did not know the Earth was spherical, did not conceptualize his measurements in these terms. This would resolve the confusion created by the earlier practice of using the difference between shadow lengths of the sun observed at the same time at two places to determine the ground distance between them. 

Yi Xing had thirteen test sites established throughout the empire, extending from Jiaozhou in Vietnam — at latitude 17°N — to the region immediately south of Lake Baikal — latitude 50°N. There were three observations done for each site, one for the height of polaris, one for the shadow lengths of summer, and one for the shadow lengths of winter. The latitudes were determined from this data, while the Tang calculation for the length of one degree of meridian was fairly accurate compared to modern calculations. Yi Xing understood the variations in the length of a degree of meridian, and criticized earlier scholars who permanently fixed an estimate for shadow lengths for the duration of the entire year.

The escapement and celestial globe
Yi Xing was famed for his genius, known to have calculated the number of possible positions on a go board game (though without a symbol for zero as he had difficulties expressing the number). He, along with his associate, the mechanical engineer and politician Liang Lingzan, is best known for applying the earliest-known escapement mechanism to a water-powered celestial globe. However, Yi Xing's mechanical achievements were built upon the knowledge and efforts of previous Chinese mechanical engineers, such as the statesman and master of gear systems Zhang Heng (78–139) of the Han Dynasty, the mechanical engineer Ma Jun (200–265) of the Three Kingdoms, and the Daoist Li Lan (c. 450) of the Southern and Northern Dynasties period.

It was the earlier Chinese inventor Zhang Heng during the Han dynasty who was the first to apply hydraulic power (i.e. a waterwheel and water clock) in mechanically-driving and rotating his equatorial armillary sphere. The arrangement followed the model of a water-wheel using the drip of a clepsydra (see water clock), which ultimately exerted force on a lug to rotate toothed-gears on a polar-axis shaft. With this, the slow computational movement rotated the armillary sphere according to the recorded movements of the planets and stars. Yi Xing also owed much to the scholarly followers of Ma Jun, who had employed horizontal jack-wheels and other mechanical toys worked by waterwheels. The Daoist Li Lan was an expert at working with water clocks, creating steelyard balances for weighing water that was used in the tank of the clepsydra, providing more inspiration for Yi Xing. Like the earlier water-power employed by Zhang Heng and the later escapement mechanism in the astronomical clock tower engineered and erected by Su Song (1020–1101), Yi Xing's celestial globe employed water-power in order for it to rotate and function properly. The British biochemist, historian, and sinologist Joseph Needham states (Wade–Giles spelling):

In regards to mercury instead of water (as noted in the quote above), the first to apply liquid mercury for motive power of an armillary sphere was Zhang Sixun in 979 AD (because mercury would not freeze during winter). During his age, the Song dynasty (960–1279) era historical text of the Song Shi mentions Yi Xing and the reason why his armillary sphere did not survive the ages after the Tang (Wade–Giles spelling):

Earlier Tang era historical texts of the 9th century have this to say of Yi Xing's work in astronomical instruments in the 8th century (Wade–Giles spelling):

Buddhist scholarship
Yi Xing wrote a commentary on the Mahavairocana Tantra. This work had a strong influence on the Japanese monk Kūkai and was key in his establishment of Shingon Buddhism.

In his honor

At the Tiantai-Buddhist Guoqing Temple of Mount Tiantai in Zhejiang Province, there is a Chinese pagoda erected directly outside the temple known as the Memorial Pagoda of Monk Yi Xing. His tomb is also located on Mount Tiantai.

See also 
List of Chinese people
List of inventors
List of mechanical engineers
Verge escapement
Villard de Honnecourt

Notes

References

Ju, Zan, "Yixing". Encyclopedia of China (Religion Edition), 1st ed.
Needham, Joseph (1986). Science and Civilization in China: Volume 3. Taipei: Caves Books, Ltd.
Needham, Joseph (1986). Science and Civilization in China: Volume 4, Part 2. Taipei: Caves Books, Ltd.
Boscaro, Adriana (2003) Rethinking Japan: Social Sciences, Ideology and Thought. Routledge. 0-904404-79-x p. 330

External links
Yi Xing at Chinaculture.org
Yi Xing's Tomb Tiantai Mountain
Yi Xing at the University of Maine

683 births
727 deaths
8th-century Buddhists
8th-century Buddhist monks
8th-century Chinese astronomers
8th-century Chinese writers
8th-century engineers
8th-century inventors
8th-century mathematicians
Chinese inventors
Chinese mechanical engineers
Chinese scholars of Buddhism
Engineers from Henan
Hydraulic engineers
Mathematicians from Henan
Medieval Chinese mathematicians
Philosophers from Henan
Tang dynasty Buddhist monks
Tang dynasty philosophers
Writers from Puyang